Bugs and Thugs is a 1954 Warner Bros. Looney Tunes cartoon directed by Friz Freleng. The short was released on March 13, 1954, and stars Bugs Bunny, with Rocky and Mugsy. The film is a semi-remake of the 1946 cartoon Racketeer Rabbit. It is also the first Warner Bros short to feature Milt Franklyn as a musical director.

In the film, Bugs mistakes the getaway car of a bank robber for a taxi, and enters it uninvited. He is then held prisoner at gunpoint.

Plot 
Bugs emerges from his hole in a city park, reading the newspaper on his way to his bank to make a withdrawal from his personal depository of carrots.

Leaving the bank, Bugs flags down what he thinks is a taxi, but which is actually Mugsy pulling up to let Rocky out to rob the bank. As Bugs settles in the back seat, Rocky returns amidst a shootout with bank security, leaps into the car and orders Mugsy to drive off. Bugs emerges from beneath the many bags of cash. Rocky pulls his gun and asks Bugs, "How much do you know [about the robbery], rabbit?" Bugs misinterprets this and reels off a list of random facts, until Rocky shuts him up by placing a gun in his mouth and threatening to pull the trigger.

Bugs asks Mugsy to stop at a gas station. Bugs gets out of the car and, after receiving a nickel from Mugsy, uses a pay phone to call the police to report the bank robbers, before Mugsy removes Bugs from the phone booth and takes him back to the car. As the car takes off, the policeman on the other end is yanked out through the phone and bounced along the road some distance behind, until the wire snaps.

Soon, the car stops at a railroad grade crossing with a "wigwag" signal warning of an approaching train. Rocky tells Bugs to get out and let them know if the coast is clear. Bugs checks the tracks and shouts "all clear". Mugsy drives forward and the car is struck by a train.

Bugs repairs the car at gunpoint but one of the wheels is missing, so Rocky makes Bugs act as the wheel, by running alongside the car while holding the right front axle. Soon, they arrive at their hideout, which is perched on a cliff. Once inside, Rocky instructs Mugsy to take Bugs into the other room and "let him have it".  Once there, Bugs easily convinces him that Rocky meant for him to let Bugs have the gun. When Mugsy relents, he gets shot by Bugs, stumbles back into the front room and passes out on top of Rocky, who quickly punches him off.

Rocky heads for the room to take care of Bugs himself. As he approaches the door, Bugs imitates both a police siren and the voice of an officer arriving and ordering other policemen to surround the house. Bugs tears out of the room, seemingly panicked about the cops showing up. Rocky is running around in the main room, desperate to find a hiding place. Bugs hides the robbers in the stove, then pretends to be the police pounding on the front door. Then, he pulls off acting as both the policeman with an Irish accent and himself trying to hide Rocky and Mugsy. While "interrogating" himself, Bugs denies hiding them in the stove, turning on the gas heat of the stove and throwing a lit match inside to "prove" his innocence. The stove explodes, and the "policeman", convinced, leaves. Rocky and Mugsy crawl out of the stove, somewhat scorched and dazed. Not even five seconds after emerging, the real policemen come and, in an almost exact match of Bugs' previous ruse, one of them (with an Irish accent) asks where Rocky and Mugsy are. When Bugs is about to throw another lit match into the stove, Rocky and Mugsy quickly run out of the stove and beg the policeman to arrest them.

The next day, Bugs becomes a criminal-catching detective talking on the phone, as a member of Detectives Guild: Local 839 (a pun on the cartoonists' union), styling himself as "Bugs Bunny, private eyeball – thugs thwarted, arsonists arrested, bandits booked, forgers found, counterfeiters caught and chiselers chiseled."

Reception
Jerry Beck writes, "A remake of director Friz Freleng's earlier crime classic Racketeer Rabbit (1946), which featured caricatures of Edward G. Robinson and Peter Lorre as the gangsters, Bugs and Thugs is faster and funnier, has a great modern design (thanks to Hawley Platt's layouts), and introduces two great new foils — Rocky and Mugsy — for Bugs Bunny."

Home media
Bugs and Thugs is available on the following DVDs:

 Looney Tunes Golden Collection: Volume 1
 Looney Tunes Platinum Collection: Volume 3
 Looney Tunes Centerstage: Volume 2

The short is also available to stream on HBO Max.

Cast
• Mel Blanc as Bugs Bunny, Rocky, Mugsy and police officers

See also 
 List of Bugs Bunny cartoons

References

External links 

 
 

1954 films
1954 animated films
1954 short films
1950s Warner Bros. animated short films
1950s heist films
American heist films
Looney Tunes shorts
Short films directed by Friz Freleng
Films scored by Milt Franklyn
Bugs Bunny films
Cultural depictions of Edward G. Robinson
1950s English-language films
Films about bank robbery
Rocky and Mugsy films